Lukian is a given name. Notable people with the name include:

 Lukian Popov (1873–1914), Russian genre painter
 Lukian (footballer) (born 1991), Lukian Araújo de Almeida, Brazilian footballer

See also
 Lukiano
 Lukin